Viktor Müller (born 12 December 1886; date of death unknown) was a Bohemian-Austrian footballer who played as a goalkeeper or defender and appeared for both the Bohemia and Austria national teams.

Career
Müller made his international debut for Bohemia as captain in the team's inaugural match on 1 April 1906 against Hungary, which finished as a 1–1 draw in Budapest. He earned three caps in total for Bohemia, all as a defender, making his final appearance on 6 October 1907 in Prague against Hungary, which finished as a 5–3 win, the national team's first victory. He later represented the Austria national team as a goalkeeper, making his first appearance on 7 May 1911 against Hungary, which finished as a 3–1 win in Vienna. He was capped five times for Austria, making his last appearance on 22 December 1912 against Italy, which finished as a 3–1 win in Genoa.

Career statistics

International

References

External links
 
 
 
 

1886 births
Year of death missing
Czech footballers
Czech Republic international footballers
Austrian footballers
Austria international footballers
Dual internationalists (football)
Association football goalkeepers
Association football defenders
Wiener Sport-Club players
Austrian Football Bundesliga players
Bohemia international footballers